Juegos de poder is a Chilean telenovela created by Luis Ponce, that premiered on Mega on March 11, 2019 and ended on December 12, 2019. It stars Álvaro Rudolphy, Jorge Zabaleta and Simón Pesutic.

Filming began in December 2018 and concluded in October 2019.

Premise  
Prosecutor Aníbal Ramos leads the search to find the truth, and will not rest until he discovers those responsible for running over two university brothers, one of them losing his life. Meanwhile, Mariano Beltrán, a candidate running for president of Chile, will do everything in his power both for his family and for maintaining his political capital and power to prevent that truth from coming out: his son Camilo is the person in charge that prosecutor Ramos is looking for.

The series' main storyline addresses situations involving bribes, setups, multiple acts of corruption and abuse of power, including murders.

Cast

Main 
 Álvaro Rudolphy as Mariano Beltrán
 Jorge Zabaleta as Aníbal Ramos
 Simón Pesutic as Camilo Beltrán
 Francisca Imboden as Pilar Egaña
 Ingrid Cruz as Karen Franco
 Augusto Schuster as Benjamín Bennet
 Patricia Rivadeneira as Verónica Egaña
 Alejandra Araya as Cynthia Bravo
 Héctor Noguera as Patricio Egaña
 Claudio Arredondo as Matías Bennet
 Pedro Campos as Francisco Beltrán
 Rodrigo Soto as Gustavo Toro
 Fernanda Ramírez as Antonia Moretti
 Paula Sharim as Elena Espinoza
 Roberto Farías as Raúl Salgado
 Lorena Capetillo as Susan Morales
 Solange Lackington as Beatriz Acosta
 Juan Carlos Maldonado as Samuel Salgado
 Manuela Moreno as Florencia Beltrán
 Christian Zúñiga as Orlando Moretti
 Ingrid Isensee as Jacqueline Cifuentes
 Fernando Olivares as Jorge Mendoza
 Agustín Vidal as Iván Rodríguez
 Carlos Martínez as Hernán Matamoros
 Alondra Valenzuela as Rocío Ramos
 Diego Boggioni as Tomás Salgado
 Catalina Stuardo as Fabiola Briceño
 Muriel Martin as Romina Baeza

Recurring 
 Carlos Morales as Boris Gajardo "El Mecha"
 Sergio Díaz as Eric Montoya
 Ricardo Mateluna as Héctor Cárdenas
 Mario Bustos as Agustín Beltrán
 Alejandra Pérez Vera as Mónica Silva
 Alejandro Goic as Alan Covacevich
 Eusebio Arenas as Joaquín García
 Mauricio Pitta as Danilo Pincheira
 Patricio Andrade as Eduardo Briceño
 Humberto Gallardo as Humberto Stanley/Humberto Rioseco
 Romana Satt as Vanesa
 Myriam Pérez as Gladys
 Elizabeth Torres as Johanna
 Denise Nazal as Teresa Serrano
 Slavija Agnic as Jocelyn Cortés
 Otilio Castro as Atilio Navarrete
 Óscar Hernández as Juan Guillermo Bossio
 Hugo Vásquez as León Hidalgo

Ratings

References

External links 
 

2019 telenovelas
2019 Chilean television series debuts
2019 Chilean television series endings
Chilean telenovelas
Mega (Chilean TV channel) telenovelas
Spanish-language telenovelas
2010s LGBT-related drama television series